Abdominal chemodectomas with cutaneous angiolipomas is a skin disease that presents with angiolipomas in the skin and chemodectomas. It is inherited in an autosomal dominant manner.

References

Dermal and subcutaneous growths
Endocrine neoplasia